Motokazu is a masculine Japanese given name. Notable people with the name include:

, Japanese surgeon and poet
, Japanese photographer and illustrator, sometimes referred to as Motokazu Kumagai

Japanese masculine given names